Valtteri Vesiaho (born 10 February 1999) is a Finnish professional footballer who plays for KTP, as a central defender. Vesiaho was born in Helsinki, Finland. He began his senior club career playing for KäPa, before signing with HJK at age 15 in 2016.

Club career

KäPa

Vesiaho made his senior debut oin 2015 with KäPa.

HJK

On 25 October 2016 HJK confirmed that Vesiaho would join the club for the 2017 season. He played for HJK until the summer 2019, where he joined TPS.

TPS

A contract with TPS was announced on 10 July 2019.

KTP

On 28 November 2019, Vasiaho signed a one-year deal with KTP, starting from 2020.

Haro Deportivo

In September 2020 he moved to Spanish club Haro Deportivo.

Córdoba CF B

On 27 July 2021 it was reported that Vesiaho had signed a contract with Córdoba CF B.

Return to KTP

Vesiaho returned to KTP for the 2022 season.

International career
Vesiaho has represented Finland on Finland U-16, Finland U-17, Finland U-18 and Finland U-19 youth teams.

References

External links 

 Cordoba B official profile
 Valtteri Vesiaho – SPL competition record 
 

1999 births
Living people
Finnish footballers
Association football defenders
Veikkausliiga players
Ykkönen players
Kakkonen players
Käpylän Pallo players
Klubi 04 players
Helsingin Jalkapalloklubi players
Turun Palloseura footballers
Kotkan Työväen Palloilijat players
Segunda División B players
Haro Deportivo players
Finnish expatriate footballers
Finnish expatriate sportspeople in Spain
Expatriate footballers in Spain
Córdoba CF B players
Footballers from Helsinki
Finland youth international footballers